National Committee on Security Affairs (NCSA) is the highest policy-making authority on national security of the Government of Bangladesh. Headed by the Prime Minister Sheikh Hasina Wajed, the committee was formed in March 2019 after 'the National Defence Policy-2018' was approved by the Cabinet of Bangladesh. The committee consists of 27 members.

The NCSA comprises the Prime Minister, ministers of Home Affairs, Information, Law, Justice and Parliamentary Affairs, Finance, Foreign Affairs, Planning, Industries, Commerce, Cabinet Secretary, Principal secretary to the Prime Minister's Office, Chief of Army Staff, Chief of Air Staff, Chief of Naval Staff, Security Advisor to the Prime Minister, Foreign Secretary, Defence Secretary, Secretaries of Public Security Division and Security Services Division at the Home Ministry, Finance Secretary, Law Secretary, Inspector General of Police, Principal Staff Officer of Armed Forces Division, Director General of National Security Intelligence, Director General of the Directorate General of Forces Intelligence and Director General of Border Guards Bangladesh and Director General of Bangladesh Coast Guard.

Functions 
 Evaluation and review of national and international security situations and other issues related to state security and defense affairs. 
 Prepare recommendations for the cabinet.
 Direct the authorities concerned to take steps

See also
 National Committee for Intelligence Coordination

References

Bangladeshi intelligence agencies
Government agencies of Bangladesh
Government agencies established in 2019